Cesiribacter roseus is a Gram-negative, rod-shaped, strictly aerobic and motile bacterium from the genus Cesiribacter which has been isolated from desert sand in Xinjiang in China.

References

External links
Type strain of Cesiribacter roseus at BacDive -  the Bacterial Diversity Metadatabase

Cytophagia
Bacteria described in 2012